Ashland Middle School may refer to:

Ashland Middle School in Ashland, Massachusetts
Ashland Middle School, part of the Ashland School District (Oregon) in Ashland, Oregon
Ashland Middle School (Ashland, Wisconsin)